Moonraker may refer to:
 Moonrakers, a colloquialism for people from Wiltshire, England

James Bond media franchise 
 Moonraker (novel), a 1955 James Bond novel by Ian Fleming
 Moonraker (film), a 1979 film based on the novel
 Moonraker (soundtrack), a soundtrack album from the film
 James Bond and Moonraker, a novelization of the 1979 film by Christopher Wood

Other arts and media 
 Moonraker (comics), a fictional character in the Marvel Comics universe
 Moonraker, a 1927 novel by F. Tennyson Jesse
 The Moonraker (play), a 1952 play by Arthur Watkyn
 The Moonraker, a 1958 British film based on the play
 Moonraker, a band featuring Mike Patton

Transport 
 Moonraker (sail), the uppermost course of sail on a fully rigged ship
 Moonraker, two superyachts with the same (original) owner Gautam Singhania, a Norship in 1992 and an Overmarine in 2014
 MOONRAKER, the callsign for charter airline Hi Fly Malta